The Michigan Wolverines baseball team represents the University of Michigan in NCAA Division I college baseball. Along with most other Michigan athletic teams, the baseball team participates in the Big Ten Conference.  They play their home games at Ray Fisher Stadium.

The Wolverines have made the College World Series eight times, winning two national championships in 1953 and 1962. Michigan is the third winningest program in NCAA Division I baseball history, trailing only Fordham and Texas. 
The team is currently coached by Tracy Smith, who replaced Erik Bakich who left Michigan to coach at Clemson.

Championships

NCAA College World Series National Championships

Conference Championships

Conference Tournament Championships

Stadium
The Wolverines play their home games in Ray Fisher Stadium.  The stadium is named after Ray Fisher, who is the winningest coach in Michigan baseball history, with 636 victories and also the 1953 College World Series championship.

In 2008, alum and owner of the New York Mets MLB franchise, Fred Wilpon donated $9 million for the renovation of Fisher Stadium and Alumni Field. It is now known as the Wilpon Baseball and Softball Complex, but more commonly known as the Wilpon Baseball Complex.

Head coaches

Year-by-year results

Michigan in the NCAA tournament
The NCAA Division I baseball tournament started in 1947.
The format of the tournament has changed through the years.

First Team All-Americans

Individual honors

Retired numbers
Michigan has retired six uniform numbers to date. Below is the detailed list:

1 Never played for the Wolverines. He coached Michigan with a record 636 wins and led the team to 15 Big Ten championships apart from winning the 1953 College World Series.

National Awards

Golden Spikes Award Winner
Jim Abbott (1987)

Baseball America College Player of the Year
Casey Close (1986)

NCBWA National Coach of the Year
Erik Bakich (2019)

Conference Awards

Big Ten Player of the Year
Jim Paciorek (1982)
Rick Stoll (1983) 
Barry Larkin (1984, 1985)
Casey Close (1986)
Jim Abbott (1988)
Scott Weaver (1995) 
Nate Recknagel (2008)
Jordan Brewer (2019)

Big Ten Pitcher of the Year
Larry Carroll (1984)
Jim Brauer (2005)
Zach Putnam (2008)

Big Ten Freshman of the Year
Scott Weaver (1993)
Jason Alcaraz (1996)
Jake Bivens (2015)

Big Ten Coach of the Year
Geoff Zahn (1997)
Rich Maloney (2007, 2008)

Big Ten Batting Title
Bill Freehan  (1961;  .585 batting average)
Carl Cmejrek  (1965;  .453 batting average)
Elliott Maddox (1968; .467 batting average)
Rick Leach  (1978;  .473 batting average)
George Foussianes  (1979;  .452 batting average)
Tony Evans  (1981;  .465 batting average)
Jim Paciorek, Ken Hayward  (1982;  .462 batting average)
Fred Erdmann  (1983;  .500 batting average)
Randy Wolfe  (1985;  .514 batting average)
Casey Close  (1986;  .469 batting average)
Scott Timmerman  (1993;  .431 batting average)
Scott Weaver  (1995;  .500 batting average)
Dominic Clementi  (2018;  .413 batting average)

University of Michigan Athletic Hall of Honor
The following 35 Michigan Wolverines baseball players and coaches (listed in order of induction) have been inducted into the University of Michigan Athletic Hall of Honor:

Bill Freehan (1978) – baseball
Bennie Oosterbaan (1978) – football, basketball, baseball, basketball coach, football coach
Ray Fisher (1979) – baseball coach
George Sisler (1979) – baseball
Buck Giles (1980) – baseball
Harry Kipke (1981) – football, basketball, and baseball
Whitey Wistert (1981) – football and baseball
Bud Chamberlain (1982) – baseball
Jack Tompkins (1982) – hockey and baseball
Elmer Gedeon (1983) – track and baseball
Dick Wakefield (1983) – baseball
Elroy Hirsch (1984) – football, basketball, baseball, and track
Bob Chappuis (1984) – football and baseball
Don Lund (1984) – football, baseball, basketball, and coaching
Doug Roby (1985) – football and baseball
Branch Rickey (1985) – baseball coach
David M. Nelson (1986) – football and baseball
Ernie McCoy (1986) basketball, football, basketball coach, and assistant athletic director
Jack Blott (1987) – football and baseball
Bruce Haynam (1988) – baseball
Frank Nunley (1989) – football and baseball
Forest Evashevski (1990) – football and baseball
Jack Weisenburger (1992) – football and baseball
Moby Benedict (1994) – baseball and coaching
Dominic Tomasi (1994) – football and baseball
Steve Boros (1996) – baseball 
Herman Fishman (2002) – basketball and baseball
Bill Mogk (2002) – baseball
Jim Abbott (2004) – baseball
J. Daniel Cline (2007) – football and baseball
Barry Larkin (2007) – baseball 
Larry Carroll (1991) - baseball
David Campbell (2009) – baseball
Rick Leach (2009) – football and baseball
Casey Close (2011) – baseball
Jim Paciorek (2020) – baseball

Wolverines in the MLB

Note: Charlie Gehringer and Derek Jeter are Baseball Hall of Fame inductees who were enrolled at Michigan, but never played for the baseball team.

Source: Baseball Reference

First-Round MLB Draft Picks

See also
List of NCAA Division I baseball programs
Big Ten baseball tournament
Big Ten baseball champions

References

External links

 

 
Baseball teams established in 1866
1866 establishments in Michigan